Scopula infantilis is a moth of the family Geometridae first described by Claude Herbulot in 1970. It is found on Madagascar.

The length of its forewing is 8 millimeters and the holotype was collected in the Ivelona valley, Andranomalaza, Madagascar.

References

Moths described in 1970
infantilis
Moths of Madagascar
Moths of Africa